Strangeways Here We Come can refer to:

Strangeways, Here We Come (album) - 1987 music album by The Smiths
Strangeways Here We Come (film) - 2017 film directed by Chris Green

See also
HM Prison Manchester, of which Strangeways is a former name, and so the phrase implies that the speaker is going to jail